Broadcast Music Inc. v. Columbia Broadcasting System Inc., 441 U.S. 1 (1979), was an important antitrust case decided by the Supreme Court of the United States.

Background 
The TV network CBS (also, at the time, owner of Columbia Records) filed an antitrust suit against licensing agencies alleging that the system by which these agencies received fees for the issuance of blanket licenses to perform copyrighted musical compositions amounted to illegal price fixing.

The basic question in the case is "whether the issuance by ASCAP and BMI to CBS of blanket licenses to copyrighted musical compositions at fees negotiated by them is price fixing per se unlawful under the antitrust laws."

Judgment
The Supreme Court held that blanket licenses issued by ASCAP and BMI did not necessarily constitute price fixing. The judgment, delivered by White J, was unanimous in holding that such practice should instead be examined under the rule of reason to determine if it is unlawful. Stevens J agreed with the majority, but would not have remanded the case to the lower courts for rehearing. He would have held that the blanket license were a breach of s1 of the Sherman Act using the rule of reason.

Significance
The case was part of the court's retreat from applying rigid per se rules in antitrust to a more permissive rule of reason.

See also

 US antitrust law
 Westmoreland v. CBS (S.D.N.Y. 1982)
 Estate of Martin Luther King, Jr., Inc. v. CBS, Inc. (11th Cir. 1999)

External links

References 

1979 in United States case law
United States antitrust case law
CBS Television Network
United States Supreme Court cases
United States Supreme Court cases of the Burger Court
Broadcast Music, Inc.